1304 may refer to

 1304, events in the year 1304 of the Gregorian calendar.
 1304 SH, a year in the Solar Hijri calendar (corresponding to 21 March 1925 – 20 March 1926 in the Gregorian calendar).

References